WAVA-FM (105.1 MHz) is a commercial radio station licensed to Arlington, Virginia, and serving the Washington metro area.  The station is owned and operated by the Salem Media Group, and airs a Christian talk and teaching radio format.  Religious leaders pay WAVA-FM for their time on the air and then seek donations to support their ministries.  Hosts include Chuck Swindoll, Jim Daly, Charles Stanley, John MacArthur, Rick Warren, David Jeremiah, Tony Evans, David Anderson.

Studios and offices are on North Lynn Street in Arlington.  The transmitter is off 19th Road North, also in Arlington.  WAVA-FM broadcasts in the HD Radio format.  The HD2 and HD3 subchannels rebroadcast two co-owned AM stations, WAVA AM 780 and WWRC AM 570.  WAVA (AM) also carries a Christian talk and teaching format, but with different shows.  WWRC airs conservative talk.

History

WARL-FM
In 1946, Northern Virginia Broadcasters, Inc., which owned AM 780 WARL (now WAVA), received a Federal Communications Commission construction permit to put an FM radio station on the air.  On August 1, 1948, the station first signed on as WARL-FM.  It was originally located at 105.5 MHz on the FM dial and was powered at only 1,000 watts, a fraction of its current output.  WARL-FM mostly simulcast its sister station.  Because the AM station was a daytimer, WARL-FM was able to continue airing the stations' programming after sunset, even though few radio listeners owned FM receivers in those days.

In the 1950, WARL-FM switched to its current frequency at 105.1 MHz.  That was coupled with a boost in power to 20,000 watts.  In 1960, WARL-AM-FM were acquired by the United States Transdynamics Corporation.  The new owners switched the call signs to WAVA and WAVA-FM.

All-news
In the 1970s, WAVA-AM-FM decided to compete with AM 1500 WTOP (now WFED) as one of Washington's two all-news radio stations.  Even though 780 WAVA was still a daytime-only station, the all-news format was heard on 105.1 WAVA-FM around the clock; as such, that made WAVA-FM the only all-news station on the FM dial in those days, when many home and car radios could only receive AM signals.

Meanwhile, WTOP was owned by the Washington Post, was a CBS Radio Network affiliate and had a 50,000 watt signal; because of this, WAVA-AM-FM were at a competitive disadvantage as an all-news outlet.  (Ironically, WTOP, still an all-news station to this day, moved to the FM dial in 2006.)

Rock era
In 1977, the two stations were sold; AM 780 went to the American Bible Society, airing a Christian radio format as WABS, while FM 105.1 kept the WAVA call letters and was sold to the WAVA Limited Partnership, airing a soft rock format.  After three years of low ratings, in 1980, WAVA-FM switched its format to AOR, branded as Rockradio 105 WAVA.  However, the new format also failed to gain many listeners.  Doubleday Broadcasting bought the station in 1982 and planned a format flip.

Top 40
On October 28, 1983, WAVA-FM switched to a CHR/Top 40 format, the first FM station to play all the hits in the D.C. market. Branded as All Hit 105 WAVA, HitRadio 105 WAVA, and Music Power 105 WAVA, it was one of D.C.'s top-rated FM stations.

In 1986, WAVA was acquired by Emmis Broadcasting. In 1992, due to financial problems after the purchase of the Seattle Mariners, Emmis decided to sell many of its stations at lower-than-market-value prices.

Salem Media ownership
WAVA-FM was sold to the Salem Media Group for $20 million.  On February 12, 1992, at midnight, after playing a montage of station memories, WAVA went off the air, with "Goodbye" by Night Ranger as the final song.  The station returned to the air the next day, stunting with Contemporary Christian music. A few days later, it adopted a Christian talk and teaching format.

References

External links
105.1 WAVA Online

The last hours of "All Hit 105" WAVA Arlington (February 12, 1992)

1948 establishments in Virginia
Talk radio stations in the United States
Radio stations established in 1948
Salem Media Group properties
AVA-FM
Arlington County, Virginia